Sheila Macintosh (née Speight) is an English squash player who won the British Open in 1960. She was also the runner-up at the championship in 1954, 1956, 1957, 1958 and in 1959.

Besides winning the British Open, she also won the Massachusetts Women's Hardball Championships in 1959 and 1963.

References

External links
Official British Open Squash Championships website
British Open historical data at Squashtalk.com

English female squash players
Living people
English female tennis players
Year of birth missing (living people)
British female tennis players
Place of birth missing (living people)